St. Alexander's Church is a church in Bokion, Lezhë District, Albania. It is a Cultural Monument of Albania.

References

Cultural Monuments of Albania
Buildings and structures in Lezhë County